The Cross and the Switchblade is a 1970 crime film starring Pat Boone as David Wilkerson and Erik Estrada as Nicky Cruz, the teen gang member whose life was transformed by Wilkerson's ministry. The film was based on a non-fiction book of the same name, The Cross and the Switchblade.

Summary 
In 1958, pentecostal pastor David Wilkerson's of Assemblies of God is touched by an article in Life Magazine about seven teenagers who are members of a criminal gang. Alone and with little money, he will go to Brooklyn, sometimes at the risk of his life, to talk about Jesus with members of street gang. A meeting will particularly mark him, that of Nicky Cruz, a member of a street gang, the "Mau maus".

Plot 
The film is based on  the true story of David Wilkerson (Pat Boone), a small-town preacher who gets caught in the shadows of a crime-ridden neighborhood in New York City. Guided by the streetwise Little Bo (Jo-Ann Robinson), David quickly learns about the neighborhood and how to approach the cynical juveniles. He encounters the Mau Maus, a gang led by president Israel (Dino Defilippi) and his "warlord," Nicky Cruz (Erik Estrada), and David brings a message of hope to the angry youths. David came to New York City from a central Pennsylvania small town (Philipsburg) with little money, and is put up in a small street chapel owned by a pastor with a loving family who supports David in his work and offers to help with food and shelter. Cruz at first dismisses Wilkerson as a joke, then as a conspiracy to break up the Mau Maus, serving to only intensify his desire to be rid of the "preacher man".

Nicky's ex-girlfriend, Rosa, asks Nicky to give her some money for her heroin addiction, and he offers to buy her all the junk she wants if she gets rid of the preacher. The pastor's wife convinces Rosa to stay with them, while they stand vigil as she goes through difficult withdrawals. After Rosa is sober, she tries to convince Nicky that David comes to them out of love, but Nicky becomes more and more frustrated. When David tries an attempt to reach out to all gang members in the area through a revival, the sheriff convinces the NYPD not to survey their neighborhood in order to have the gangs think they are being left alone. Nicky agrees with Big Cat, the leader of the rival Bishops, that they should rumble at the revival since no one would expect that. However, during David's sermon, his message that no one can be labeled and Christ's death on the Cross reaches Nicky, and he stops the gangs from fighting. The film concludes by saying that in the question of the Cross and the Switchblade, the Cross proved stronger.

Nicky Cruz would go on to become an ordained minister, preaching the Gospel due to the initial efforts of David Wilkerson. In the end, they start a center called Teen Challenge to support teens.

Cast

Production
By 1968 Wilkerson's book had sold more than four million copies. By 1975 that figure would be over six million.

Pat Boone read a copy of the book after seeing it at an airport newsstand on the way to Mexico City. He was immediately taken with it, calling it "a modern day sequel to the Acts of the Apostles in the New Testament." He and an associate, Clint Davidson, took out an option on the book but were unable to raise finance. Boone said "the uniform response was that 'religion is poison at the box office'."

However plans started to take shape when Rick Ross and Associates became involved. Ross had spent 15 years making films for Billy Graham's organisation. The American Baptist Convention helped distribute the film. In June 1969 Don Murray was working on a screenplay.

Filming took place in Harlem in October 1969.  "I've been trying to get this story filmed for five years," said Boone. "Working in Harlem has been wonderful – everyone, including the police, has been very cooperative. Maybe they sense this isn't a religious or a 'church' drama."

It was the first credit for Erik Estrada.

It was Pat Boone's last lead in a feature for over twenty years.

Reception
The film received positive reviews from Christians and moviegoers alike. Pat Boone regards the film as one of his favourites. "I took a huge gamble with that film," he says. "Financially it didn't pay off because I did it for next to nothing – I virtually did it as a charity but I don't regret it at all. Within its limitations it was a very well made film."

The Los Angeles Times said the film was "hard to take" adding that Boone was "unconvincing" as Wilkerson. "Dressed and groomed like a movie star throughout [he] is the biggest obstacle of all to the suspension of disbelief." The critic for the New York Times said "I liked it... the script... has a pungent, savy edge and some amusing dialogue... the colour photography is excellent... three of the youngsters can really act."

Box office 
The film was a box office success aired in 30 languages in 150 countries.

A comic book version of the film was also issued.

References

Notes

External links
 

Films about evangelicalism
1970 films
Films set in New York City
American gang films
American vigilante films
Films based on American novels
1970 directorial debut films
Films shot in New York City
Films adapted into comics
1970s English-language films
1970s American films